was a Japanese filmmaker and special effects director responsible for many Japanese science-fiction films and television shows.

Early life 
Kuroda was born on March 4, 1928, in Matsuyama, Ehime, in his youth Kuroda's family moved to Kyoto. Kuroda wanted to be a child actor and was classmates with cinematographer Fujio Morita at Kyoto Municipal Tahata Elementary School.

Selected works

Director 

 Yokai Monsters: Spook Warfare (1968)
 Yokai Monsters: Along with Ghosts (1969) [with Kimiyoshi Yasuda]
 The Invisible Swordsman (1970)
 Mirrorman (1971)
 Oshizamurai Kiichihōgan (1973)
 Lone Wolf and Cub: White Heaven in Hell (1974)
Monkey (1978)
Shadow Warriors (1980)
Kyotaro Nishimura's Travel Mystery: the Mysteries of Ghost Ship (1980)
Shin Hissatsu Shigotonin (1981-82)Fangs of Darkness: Vengeance (1982)

 Assistant director 

 Fighting Birds (1956)
 Sleepy Eyes of Death (1964)Monkey (1978)

 Director of special effects 

 Daimajin (1966)
 Return of Daimajin (1966)
 Daimajin Strikes Again (1966)
 The Invisible Swordsman (1970)

 Assistant special effects director 

 Nichiren to Mōko Daishūrai (1958)
 Buddha'' (1961)

References

Sources

External links 

 

1928 births
2015 deaths
Special effects people
Japanese film directors